North Carolina Central University (NCCU or NC Central) is a public historically black university in Durham, North Carolina. Founded by James E. Shepard in affiliation with the Chautauqua movement in 1909, it was supported by private funds from both Northern and Southern philanthropists. It was made part of the state system in 1923, when it first received state funding and was renamed as Durham State Normal School. It added graduate classes in arts and sciences and professional schools in law and library science in the late 1930s and 1940s.

In 1969 the legislature designated this a regional university and renamed it as North Carolina Central University. It has been part of the University of North Carolina system since 1972 and offers programs at the baccalaureate, master's, professional, and doctoral levels. The university is a member of the Thurgood Marshall College Fund.

History

North Carolina Central University was founded by James E. Shepard as the National Religious Training School and Chautauqua for the Colored Race in the Hayti District. Chautauqua was an educational movement that originated in the Northeast. The school was chartered in 1909 as a private institution and opened on July 5, 1910. Woodrow Wilson, the future U.S. president, contributed some private support for the school's founding.

The school was sold and reorganized in 1915, becoming the National Training School; it was supported by Margaret Olivia Slocum Sage, a philanthropist of New York who was particularly concerned about education. (She founded the Russell Sage Foundation and made generous bequests to several schools.) The National Training School supported Black teacher development in the Jim Crow era, a time when Black education was underfunded by southern states at both the lower and upper levels. 

Becoming a state-funded institution in 1923, this school was renamed as Durham State Normal School for Negroes; normal schools trained teachers for elementary grades. In 1925, reflecting the expansion of its programs to a four-year curriculum with a variety of majors, the General Assembly converted the institution into the North Carolina College for Negroes, dedicating it to the offering of liberal arts education and the preparation of teachers and principals of secondary schools. It was the nation's first state-supported liberal arts college for black students. To avoid the state Jim Crow system of segregated passenger cars on trains, Shepard insisted on traveling to Raleigh by car to lobby the legislature. The college's first four-year class graduated in 1929.

The college was accredited by the Southern Association of Colleges and Secondary Schools as an "A" class institution in 1937 and was admitted to membership in that association in 1957. Graduate courses in the School of Arts and Sciences were added in 1939, in the School of Law in 1940, and in the School of Library Science in 1941. A "race relations conference" was held at the college in July 1944.

In 1947, the General Assembly changed the name of the institution to North Carolina College at Durham. On October 6, 1947, Shepard, the founder and president, died. He was succeeded in 1948 by Alfonso Elder. At the time of Elder's election he was serving as head of the Graduate Department of Education and had formerly been dean of the College of Arts and Sciences. Elder retired September 1, 1963. Samuel P. Massie was appointed as the president on August 9, 1963, and resigned on February 1, 1966. On July 1, 1967, Albert N. Whiting assumed the presidency. He served as president and chancellor of the institution. Among the significant developments during his service was the creation of NCCU School of Business. Programs in public administration and criminal justice were also launched. Whiting retired June 30, 1983.

The 1969 General Assembly designated the institution as one of the State's regional universities, and the name was changed to North Carolina Central University.  Since 1972, NCCU has been a constituent institution of the University of North Carolina system. On July 1, 1972, the state's four-year colleges and universities were joined to become The Consolidated University of North Carolina, with 16 individual campuses headed by a single president and governed by the University of North Carolina Board of Governors. However, each campus was led by a separate chancellor and a campus-specific board of trustees.

Whiting was succeeded by LeRoy T. Walker as chancellor, followed by Tyronza R. Richmond, Julius L. Chambers (who had previously been director-counsel (chief executive) of the NAACP Legal Defense and Educational Fund), James H. Ammons, Charlie Nelms, and Debra Saunders-White in 2013. Saunders-White was the first woman to hold the office on a permanent basis (Donna Benson was the first woman to serve as interim chancellor of the university). Saunders-White took a leave of absence in 2016, then provost, Johnson O. Akinleye, was appointed as acting chancellor. Following her death in November 2016, Akinleye became interim chancellor.

Johnson O. Akinleye was elected as the 12th chancellor of NCCU on June 26, 2017. In this position, Akinleye has worked to expand the university's academic partnerships, including new agreements with community colleges, as well as introduced a robust online, distance-education program, NCCU Online. He also created K-12 initiatives and implemented a security strategy to increase safety for campus constituents.

Campus
The campus is located about a mile south of downtown Durham, North Carolina and about three miles east of Duke University. Eleven buildings built before 1940 are included in a national historic district.  All of the buildings, except for the three residences, are Georgian Revival-style buildings; they have contemporary fireproof construction with steel trusses and brick exterior walls.  They include the James E. Shepard Administration Building, Alexander Dunn Hall, Annie Day Shepard Hall, and five institutional buildings built in the late 1930s under the auspices of the Public Works Administration.  The campus was listed on the National Register of Historic Places in 1986.

Organization
NCCU is a part of the University of North Carolina (UNC) System. The campus is governed by a thirteen-member Board of Trustees: eight elected, four appointed, and the president of the Student Government Association also serves as an ex-officio member. The Board elects its officers annually and meets five times per year.

As of Fall 2020, NCCU had a total of 8,078 students, (full and part-time) including 6,067 undergraduate and 1,608 graduate students. Nearly 70% are women and 30% are men. 71.6% percent are Black, 9.7% are white, 6.6% are Hispanic and 1.3 Asian. As of 2020, NCCU had a student faculty ratio of 16:1.

Schools and colleges
School of Business (AACSB-accredited)
School of Education
School of Law
School of Library & Information Sciences
 College of Health & Sciences
 College of Arts, Social Sciences & Humanities
 School of Graduate Studies

Research institutes
The Julius L. Chambers Biomedical Biotechnology Research Institute (BBRI)
Biomanufacturing Research Institute and Technology Enterprise (BRITE)

Additional programs
University Honors Program (UHP)
NCCU Online
Evening & Weekend Degree Programs

Student activities

Student organizations
North Carolina Central University has over 130 registered student organizations and 12 honor societies.

Student media
The students of North Carolina Central University publish the Campus Echo, a bi-weekly newspaper that has been in publication since the school's founding in 1910.  The Campus Echo contains articles covering local events, arts and entertainment, and sports among other topics.

Gallery

Athletics

NCCU sponsors fourteen men's and women's sports teams that participate in the National Collegiate Athletic Association (NCAA) Division I as a newly readmitted member of the Mid-Eastern Athletic Conference. Athletic teams include football, softball, baseball, basketball, track and field, tennis, volleyball, bowling, and golf.

Notable alumni

References

External links

 
 NCCU Athletics website

 
Universities and colleges accredited by the Southern Association of Colleges and Schools
University and college buildings on the National Register of Historic Places in North Carolina
Historic districts on the National Register of Historic Places in North Carolina
Universities and colleges in Durham, North Carolina
Educational institutions established in 1910
1910 establishments in North Carolina
Public Works Administration in North Carolina
Georgian Revival architecture in North Carolina
Buildings and structures in Durham County, North Carolina
National Register of Historic Places in Durham County, North Carolina
Public universities and colleges in North Carolina
Historically black universities and colleges in the United States